Luis Alberto Pérez Franco (born 27 January 1969) is a Chilean former footballer who played as a midfielder and current manager.

Playing career
Pérez joined Colo-Colo youth system in the late 1970s thanks to the former player Bernardo Bello, who met him playing in the Tabancura neighborhood in Las Condes, Santiago. After having little chance to play for the first team, he played on loan at Deportes Valdivia, Deportes Linares, Deportes Arica and Magallanes.

In his homeland, Pérez also played for Coquimbo Unido, Santiago Morning and Unión San Felipe. 

Abroad, he played for the French clubs FC Lorient, AS Dompierroise and US Chanay. In the United States, he played for Western Mass Pioneers.

Coaching career

Pérez worked at the Colo-Colo youth system for eight years, taking part of the training of players such as Vicente Pizarro, Luciano Arriagada, Luis Rojas, Alexander Oroz, among others. In 2017, he joined  thanks to the former footballers Leonel Herrera and his son of the same name, winning the league title of the Tercera B.

Since then, he also won league titles of the Tercera A with Deportes Linares (2019, 2022) and Trasandino in 2021.

Pérez was confirmed as coach of Deportes Linares for the 2023 season.

Honours

As manager
Municipal Santiago
 Tercera B: 2017

Deportes Linares
 Tercera A: 
 Tercera A: 

Trasandino
 Tercera A:

References

External links
 Luis Pérez at PlaymakerStats.com
 Luis Pérez EnElCamarín.cl 
 

1969 births
Living people
Chilean footballers
Footballers from Santiago
Chilean expatriate footballers
Colo-Colo footballers
Deportes Valdivia footballers
Deportes Linares footballers
San Marcos de Arica footballers
Deportes Magallanes footballers
Magallanes footballers
FC Lorient players
Coquimbo Unido footballers
Santiago Morning footballers
Unión San Felipe footballers
Western Mass Pioneers players
Chilean Primera División players
Primera B de Chile players
Championnat National players
USL Second Division players
Chilean expatriate sportspeople in France
Chilean expatriate sportspeople in the United States
Expatriate footballers in France
Expatriate soccer players in the United States
Association football midfielders
Chilean football managers
Trasandino de Los Andes managers
Segunda División Profesional de Chile managers